Below are the results for the 2013 (and inaugural) World Series of Poker Asia Pacific tournaments.

Key

Results

Event #1: $1,100 No Limit Hold'em Accumulator

 5-Day Event: April 4-8
 Number of Entries: 1,085
 Total Prize Pool: $1,085,000
 Number of Payouts: 90
 Winning Hand:

Event #2: $1,650 Pot Limit Omaha

 3-Day Event: April 7-9
 Number of Entries: 172
 Total Prize Pool: $258,000
 Number of Payouts: 18
 Winning Hand:

Event #3: $2,200 Mixed Event

 3-Day Event: April 8-10
 Number of Entries: 81
 Total Prize Pool: $162,000
 Number of Payouts: 9
 Winning Hand: 10-9-8-3-2 (2-7 Triple Draw)

Event #4: $5,000 No Limit Hold'em Six Handed

 3-Day Event: April 9-11
 Number of Entries: 167
 Total Prize Pool: $835,000
 Number of Payouts: 18
 Winning Hand:

Event #5: $10,000 No Limit Hold'em Main Event

 5-Day Event: April 11-15
 Number of Entries: 405
 Total Prize Pool: $3,847,500
 Number of Payouts: 40
 Winning Hand:

Notes

World Series of Poker Asia Pacific
2013 in poker